The Indigenous People of Biafra (IPOB) is a nationalist separatist group in Nigeria that aims to restore the Republic of Biafra, a country which seceded from Nigeria prior to the Nigerian Civil War (1967-1970) and later rejoined Nigeria after its defeat by the Nigerian military. Since 2021, IPOB and other Biafran separatist groups have  been fighting a low-level guerilla conflict in southeastern Nigeria against the Nigerian government. The group was founded in 2012 by Nnamdi Kanu and Uche Mefor. Kanu is known as a British Nigerian political activist known for his advocacy of the contemporary Biafran independence movement. It was deemed a terrorist organization by the Nigerian government in 2017 under the Nigerian Terrorism Act. As of May 2022, the United Kingdom started denying asylum to members of IPOB who engaged in human rights abuses, though the U.K. government clarified that IPOB had not been designated as a terrorist organisation.

IPOB has criticized the Nigerian federal government for poor investment, political alienation, inequitable resource distribution, ethnic marginalization, and heavy military presence, extrajudicial killings in the South-Eastern, South-Central and parts of North-Central regions of the country. The organization rose to prominence in the mid-2010s and is now the largest Biafran independence organization by membership. In recent years, it has gained significant media attention for becoming a frequent target of political crackdowns by the Nigerian government. It also has numerous sites and communication channels serving as the only trusted social apparatus educating and inculcating first hand information and news to its members.

Background 
Biafra had previously existed as an Independent multi-ethnic Republic consisting of the Igbo, Ijaw, Efik and Ibibio peoples to name a few and was declared by Lieutenant Colonel Odumegwu Ojukwu for three years, 1967 through 1970. The federal government fought hard to preserve the Federal Republic of Nigeria, and did not like the idea of an independent state of Biafra. The result of tensions between Biafra and the federal government resulted in the Nigerian civil war that went on for three years. There were an estimated one to 3.5 million deaths that were heavily civilian casualties caused by starvation and death on the side of Biafra. In 1970, the Biafran forces surrendered through the armistice brokered by the defunct OAU.

Leadership 
The leader of the Indigenous People of Biafra is Nnamdi Kanu who is a dual British and Nigerian citizen. He created IPOB after he initially gained fame from his broadcasts on Radio Biafra, which was established in 2009. This was a radio station from London that broadcast messages that called for "freedom of Biafrans" and criticised corruption in the government of Nigeria. Radio Biafra catalyzed Kanu's rise to the public scene, as he was previously an unknown figure. Kanu was arrested by the Nigerian security forces on 19 October 2015, on charges of "sedition, ethnic incitement and treasonable felony."

Links with other groups 
There have been many other pro-Biafran groups that have come into existence. The Movement for the Actualization of the Sovereign State of Biafra (MASSOB) began gaining attention in the early 2000s, along with the Biafra Zionist Movement (BZM) which rose to the spotlight in 2012. The Indigenous People of Biafra (IPOB) emerged in 2012 as well after these other groups.

IPOB emerged to continue the movement that had been championed by MASSOB. MASSOB was formed in 1999 by its national leader Ralph Uwazuruike. However, the organization was severely weakened due to alleged state repression and disagreement within the group about leadership. MASSOB accused Uwazuruike of associating himself with "mainstream Nigerian politics" instead of furthering the cause of Biafra. These conflicts contributed to the formation of another faction named BZM. BZM leader Benjamin Igwe Onwuka and many members of the group were arrested for treason by the Nigerian government at a rally that took place on 5 November 2012 in the region of Enugu. BZM's activities were scaled down because of arrests and trials of many lead members of the organization. Both of these pro-Biafran groups set up the rise of IPOB which continues championing the same causes.

Protest 
There has been recent peaceful protest in the country regarding IPOB. The organizations leader and a prominent activist named Nnamdi Kanu has been arrested by Nigeria's Department of State Services on 19 October 2015. In response to his arrest there has been a group of pro-Biafran protesters who have been leading marches in eastern parts of Nigeria to push for his release. His arrest has pushed IPOB supporters into gaining further traction, as their mobilization grew. There have been many protesters and police clashes; on 2 December 2015, nine protesters and two policemen were killed at a protest in Onitsha, Anambra state. Since that date, there have been thousands of protesters who have been reportedly killed by policemen and militia paid by the government in Aba, Onitsha, Enugu and Umuhahia. The cause in rising protests are attributed to the claimed political disenfranchisement among the Igbo people and much trauma that continues as an effect of the Nigerian civil war. There are weekly lockdowns in many towns, pro-Biafra citizens are unable to leave their homes for days. This is an ongoing occurrence in 2023.

IPOB supporters have cited historical events such as the 2016 election of President Donald Trump, and Britain's vote to exit the European Union as proof of international support for "self-determination." According to many sources, Donald Trump's victory provides hope for the IPOB group in their ability to secede from Nigeria. Trump's political interests are in line with supporting Biafra, because of oil pursuits. U.S. oil company outputs in Nigeria have been cut by militants in the Niger Delta who have been continually attacking pipelines.  Therefore, IPOB figures contend that it is within the United States' economic interest to support the Biafran secessionist movement due to agitations in the region. However, as of yet Trump has made no public statement in support of Biafran self-determination.

The pro-Biafran protesters are calling for the immediate release of Nnamdi Kanu and other Biafran activists that have been jailed. Most importantly they want an independence referendum to have a date set by the government. The editor of pro-Biafran media outlet 'Voice of Biafra' Nnabuike Nnadede stated that the Igbo people suffer from a lack of resources and investment from the Nigerian government. The main reason for their protests are because they want the opportunity to vote for independence.

State response and treatment 
The Federal High Court in Abuja has labelled the IPOB as a terrorist organization on 18 September 2017. The IPOB have fought against this proscription, and sought to reverse the court's decision in 2018. However, their attempt has ultimately been unsuccessful, and they continue to be declared as terrorist organization under Nigeria's Terrorism Act.

According to sources, the Nigerian State has utilized violent and excessive police force in order to silence pro-Biafran movements. This police violence has been ongoing from 2014, first targeting MASSOB and IPOB after its formation. In 2008, MASSOB claimed that 2,020 of their members had been massacred and extrajudicially killed by the state. Amnesty International released a report detailing that countless IPOB protesters were killed between the 29th through 30 May 2016 during a governmental operation wanting to prevent IPOB members marching from Nkpor motor park to a rally.  The Nigerian army claims that they were acting in self-defense, and that the death count lies at five instead of fifty. These killings have not been investigated by Nigeria, despite urgings from Amnesty International.

Human rights organizations have been keeping records of extrajudicial killings in Biafra. They claim that from August 2015 through February 2016, 170 unarmed civilians were killed and that 400 were arrested, charged or detained without a proper trial.

Kanu's trial and detention 
The leader of IPOB, Nnamdi Kanu has failed to appear in court since April 25, 2017 to answer to the charges against him by the federal government. He had previously been detained without trial for over a year and was arraigned on November 8, 2016, for charges of criminal conspiracy, membership of an illegal organization and intimidation. He was granted bail after several public agitations including World Igbo Summit Group in April 2017 because of health concerns that the judge said needed better medical attention that couldn't be provided by the prison. However, he was barred from granting interviews, meeting in groups larger than ten individuals, organizing and attending rallies or social functions. Kanu disappeared after September 2017 after a premeditated attack on his home village, Umuahia by the combined forces of the Airforce and Army. Through a Radio Biafra broadcast he explains that his disappearance is because President Muhammdu Buhari sent the military to execute him in his home. The military denies the occurrence of this raid, despite an obvious video footage of the gruesome attack. There has been speculation that Kanu had fled to Israel for safety, after a Facebook livestream video depicted an individual resembling Kanu praying at the Western Wall in Jerusalem. The Israeli foreign ministry stated that Israel cannot confirm this allegation as they do not have any evidence of Kanu in the country. Now, the court has revoked the bail of Kanu and the trial judge Binta Nyako has ordered the immediate arrest of Kanu and stated that his treasonable felony will proceed despite his absence. On June 29, 2021, the Nigerian government announced that Nnamdi Kanu had been rearrested. He was subsequently charged to court again and remanded in the custody of the department of state services.

2020/2021 clashes

In August 2020, the department of state services (DSS) were accused by IPOB of killing 21 of his members and arresting 47 members across different locations. The DSS claims two of its officers were killed by IPOB members. Both sides accused each other of firing the first shot and that the attack was unprovoked. Casualties cannot be independently verified. Following the incident, IPOB vowed to retaliate and called on its members to start practicing self-defense.

On December 12, 2020, Kanu announced the formation of the Eastern Security Network (ESN), a regional security force, which he said it purpose is to flush out bandits and illegal forest occupants that always clash with farmers in Biafra land. The Nigerian Army deployed to locate ESN camps two weeks later. On January 22, Nigerian soldiers invaded Orlu to search for ESN operatives. Eight buildings were burnt and one person was killed in the ensuing events. Security forces re-invaded the area three days later, clashing with the ESN and killing at least five people before being repulsed by the ESN. Four Nigerian soldiers were killed in the fighting. The Nigerian Army withdrew, and in the following days, Nigerian Air Force planes and helicopters deployed to search for ESN operatives in and around Orlu. Before the Nigerian Army could launch another attack, Kanu ordered the ESN to cease fire and withdraw from Orlu, ending the crisis.

Shortly after the Orlu Crisis, IPOB gave all the governors of southeast Nigeria 14 days to ban open grazing, threatening to deploy the ESN to enforce a ban if the authorities did not do so.

On April 9, 2021, IPOB formally allied itself with the Ambazonia Governing Council (AGovC) and the Ambazonia Defence Forces. The alliance was denounced by the Interim Government of Ambazonia as well as by other Biafran separatist groups.

According to a BBC News Pidgin report, the Nigerian Army raided the IPOB headquarters seizing weapons in a joint operation with State Services and IRT operatives (Nigerian Army Police Intelligence Response Team). Government officials described it as a success.

In course of the insurgency, IPOB militants have been accused of committing war crimes such as murdering civilians, including children. One of the most notable attacks were the May 2022 Anambra State killings.

See also
 Radio Biafra
 Republic of Biafra
 Nigerian Civil War
The Flag of Biafra
 Igbo people
 Movement for the Emancipation of the Niger Delta
 Niger Delta People's Volunteer Force
 Movement for the Actualization of the Sovereign State of Biafra

References

External links

Peaceful pro-Biafra activists killed in chilling crackdown (Amnesty International)

People from Biafra
Independence movements
Politics of Nigeria
Separatism in Nigeria
Secessionist organizations